L'Ordre de l'Harmonie (French: "The Order of Unity"), also called Solfjädersorden (Swedish: "The Order of the Hand fan"), was a Swedish royal dynastic order, founded by Queen Louisa Ulrika of Sweden in 1744. It was awarded to 22 people between 1744 and 1746.

History 
On 29 August 1744, the day before the wedding between Louisa Ulrika of Prussia and Adolf Frederick, King of Sweden, the royal company traveled by boat to the wedding on the Drottningholm Palace. On this occasion, Louisa Ulrika accidentally broke her hand fan. Adolf Frederick collected the pieces of the broken fan and distributed them to those present as a memento of the incident, which gave Louisa Ulrika the idea to create the order.

Louisa Ulrika was known for her political ambitions and her order was interpreted, both nationally and internationally, to have the political significance of unity before division, signalling her ambition to abolish the parliamentary system of the Age of Liberty in favor of an absolute monarchy.

Recipients

 Edvard Didrik Taube
 Herman Cedercreutz
 Carl Gustaf Tessin
 Ulla Tessin
 Frederick I of Sweden
 Adolf Frederick, King of Sweden 
 Prince Augustus William of Prussia

References 

 Berghman, Arvid (1949). Nordiska riddareordnar och dekorationer. Skrifter utgivna av Riksheraldikerämbetet. Malmö: J. Kroon, Malmö ljustrycksanstalt. Sid. 24–25. Libris 1388795
 Nationalencyklopedin.
 Olof Jägerskiöld (1945). Lovisa Ulrika. Stockholm: Wahlström & Widstrand. ISBN

Dynastic orders
1744 establishments in Sweden
Orders, decorations, and medals of Sweden
Sweden during the Age of Liberty